Ao is a village in Väike-Maarja Parish, Lääne-Viru County, in northeastern Estonia.

Philologist and physician Friedrich Robert Faehlmann (1798–1850) was born in Ao Manor.

References
 

Villages in Lääne-Viru County
Kreis Jerwen